Bryant McFadden (born November 21, 1981) is a former American football cornerback. He played college football at Florida State and was drafted by the Pittsburgh Steelers in the second round of the 2005 NFL Draft. McFadden was also a member of the Arizona Cardinals. He earned two Super Bowl rings during his time with the Steelers, Super Bowl XL and Super Bowl XLIII.
McFadden currently serves as a studio analyst for the all-digital sports network, 120 Sports. He also hosts Huddlecast, the football podcast of his alma mater, Florida State University.

Early years
Bryant McFadden attended McArthur High School in Hollywood, Florida. He was ranked the top cornerback by most recruiting services. As a senior, he was a USA Today All-USA selection, a Parade All-America first-team selection, and named to the Super Southern 100 team by The Atlanta Journal-Constitution, after posting two interceptions and 75 tackles. As a junior, he posted one interception and 75 tackles.

College career
McFadden played college football at Florida State University where he finished his career with 107 tackles. He played free safety at FSU, but he also sometimes doubled as a cornerback. He majored in computer graphics, with a minor in studio art.

Professional career

Pittsburgh Steelers
Bryant was drafted 62nd overall in the 2005 NFL Draft, as a nickel back. He recorded his first career interception against Jacksonville in Week 5.

Filling in at the starting position for the injured Deshea Townsend, McFadden intercepted a Byron Leftwich pass in the Steelers' end zone. The interception led to a game-tying Jeff Reed 29-yard field goal. The Steelers ended up losing, 23-17.

Bryant is also well known among Steelers fans for his two big plays in the AFC Divisional Playoffs against the Indianapolis Colts. After Jerome Bettis's crucial fumble at the goal line, Colts' quarterback Peyton Manning threw to the end zone for wide receiver Reggie Wayne. Bryant tipped the ball away at the last second. On the next play, Manning again went deep for Wayne, and McFadden tipped it away again. Mike Vanderjagt then missed a game-tying field goal.

He finished his debut season with 18 tackles, one interception and a victory at Super Bowl XL.

In the third game of the 2007 season against the San Francisco 49ers, he intercepted the ball and ran it back for a touchdown. He ended the campaign with 22 tackles and one interception.

Arizona Cardinals
An unrestricted free agent in the 2009 offseason, McFadden signed a two-year, $10 million contract with the Arizona Cardinals, the team the Steelers had just beaten in Super Bowl XLIII. McFadden finished the season with 69 tackles.

Pittsburgh Steelers (second stint)
McFadden, along with Arizona's sixth round draft pick, was traded back to the Steelers during the 2010 NFL Draft, in exchange for the Steelers' second fifth round draft pick.

At the end of the 2010 season, McFadden and the Steelers appeared in Super Bowl XLV against the Green Bay Packers. He started and recorded four total tackles in the 31–25 loss.

He played two seasons with the Steelers, with 91 tackles in 29 games, and was released on February 8, 2012.

Broadcasting career 
While still a player, for three seasons, McFadden hosted his own 30-minute weekly TV show on WPMY, “The Hometowne Sports B-Mac Corner.” He also hosted a weekly radio show on Pittsburgh’s WEAE-FM in 2011-12.

Following his playing career, McFadden joined the team at 120 Sports, an all-digital sports network based out of Chicago, where he now serves as a studio analyst.

In addition to his work on 120 Sports, McFadden has worked as a game analyst for the 2015 Southern Heritage Classic on Fox Sports South, and been a regular guest on radio shows across the country, including national broadcasts on ESPN Radio and Sirius/XM.

In 2018, McFadden joined CBS Sports HQ appearing regularly during the NFL season as an analyst for their weekly football shows.

McFadden joins several of his Steelers’ teammates who have moved into broadcasting after their playing careers, including Jerome Bettis, Ryan Clark, Ike Taylor and Hines Ward.

References

External links

Arizona Cardinals bio
Florida State Seminoles bio
Pittsburgh Steelers bio

1981 births
Living people
Players of American football from South Carolina
African-American players of American football
American football cornerbacks
Florida State Seminoles football players
Pittsburgh Steelers players
Arizona Cardinals players
21st-century African-American sportspeople
20th-century African-American people